John Wiley Bryant (born February 22, 1947) is an American politician who represented Texas's 5th congressional district in the 98th to 104th U.S. Congress.

Early life and education
Bryant was born in Lake Jackson, Brazoria County, Texas. Following a B.A. at Southern Methodist University, Dallas, Texas in 1969 Bryant studied law at Southern Methodist University School of Law, where he graduated in 1972. He was also admitted to the Texas bar in 1972. Bryant served as counsel to a committee of the Texas senate in 1973.

Political career
Bryant was elected to Texas house of representatives in a special election in 1974 and was reelected from 1974 to 1982.

He was elected as a Democrat to the 98th Congress in 1982 and to the six succeeding Congresses, serving from 1983 to 1997. 

While in the United States House of Representatives Bryant was one of the House impeachment managers who prosecuted the case in the impeachment trial of Judge Alcee Hastings. Hastings was found guilty by the United States Senate and removed from his federal judgeship.

In 1996 Bryant was an unsuccessful candidate for nomination to the United States Senate election in Texas, 1996. 

Bryant would not reenter politics until 2021.

Post congressional career
In the mid-1990s he was one of the co-founders of the United Baseball League (UBL) which was a planned third major league. Bryant is a current student of Perkins School of Theology and taking a prayer and spirituality course as he pursues a discipline in Spiritual Discipline.

In 2021, John Bryant filed to run for state representative in Texas's 114th district, after being out of politics for 24 years. Bryant declared, “I am so alarmed at the continued extremes to which the Trump forces has gone in trying to take our country over and now this has arrived in Texas. I want to get off the sidelines and get back into the fight.” He won the primary in May 2022. He won the general election in November 2022.

References

External links

1947 births
Living people
Democratic Party members of the Texas House of Representatives
Texas lawyers
Southern Methodist University alumni
People from Lake Jackson, Texas
Democratic Party members of the United States House of Representatives from Texas